Ezra Churchill Henniger (July 6, 1873 – May 26, 1959) was a Canadian politician. He served in the Legislative Assembly of British Columbia from 1937 to 1941  from the electoral district of Grand Forks-Greenwood, a member of the Liberal party.

References

1873 births
1959 deaths